The Champion of Champions is a stakes race annually held at Los Alamitos Race Course in Cypress, California.  It is the championship race for Quarter Horses.

The field is determined by the winners of qualifying races held around the United States. The races currently are:
Los Alamitos Winter Championship,
Remington Park Championship,
Vessels Maturity,
All American Derby,
Mildred Vessels Memorial,
Robert L. Boniface Los Alamitos Invitational Championship,
Los Alamitos Super Derby, and the
Bank of America Challenge Championship.

The two fastest times in the Z. Wayne Griffin Directors Trials receive the last two berths. The winner of the Go Man Go Handicap qualifies as the first alternate if one of the qualifying race winners does not compete.

The Champion of Champion was not held in 2014 due to concerns over the widespread use of clenbuterol, a drug not permitted at Los Alamitos.

Records
Speed  record:
 :20.939 - Apollitical Jess (2010)

Most wins by a jockey:
 4 - Jerry Nicodemus (1976, 1977, 1980, 1981)
 4 - Bruce Pilkenton (1983, 1988, 1983, 1984)

Most wins by a trainer:
 9 - Blane Schvaneveldt (1978, 1980, 1985, 1987, 1990, 1992, 1993, 1994, 1995)

Most wins by a horse:
 3 - Refrigerator (1992, 1993, 1994) 
 2 - Dash For Cash (1976, 1977)
 2 - SLM Big Daddy (1997, 1998)
 2 - Tailor Fit (1999, 2001)
 2 - Apollitical Pence (2020, 2021)

Winners of the Champion of Champions

Notes 
In 2010, Apollitical Jess set a new track record with a time of :20.939. Prior in 2008, Jess You and I set a new track record, becoming the first to break the 21 second barrier in the race when he recorded a time of :20.94.  The second-place finisher, Little Bit of Baja, also eclipsed the old world record turning in a time of :20.97.  In 2009, Freaky ran in 21.06 and in 2013 Last to Fire's time was :21.09. The previous record of :21.13 had been established in the 2007 running won by World Champion Blues Girl Too, which broke Dash For Cash's 1976 track record of :21.17.

2007's victory by Blues Girl Too made her the sport's all-time leading female earner.

2005's renewal saw the first time the first four finishers of the Champion of Champions were three-year-olds.

1993 saw Refrigerator become the sport's all-time leading money earner with his victory.

During the summer of 1986, eight-year-old Sgt Pepper Feature was claimed for $12,500 and immediately retired.  The superstar gelding ran fifth in his 62nd race, retiring with just over $900,000 in career earnings.  The group who claimed him includes Bob Baffert and Mike Pegram.

1983's running was the first running to feature Grade I status.

1979 saw Mr Doty Bars win at 22-1. 

2017 saw Mr PYC To You win at 60-1.

References

External links
 List of Champion of Champions winners
 https://web.archive.org/web/20080828030723/http://www.losalamitos.com/laqhr/cofc2006/history.html

Horse races in California